William Leighton was a composer and also MP for Much Wenlock.

William Leighton may also refer to:

William T. Leighton, architect
William Leighton (Lord Mayor of London), Lord Mayor of London in 1806
William Allport Leighton, botanist
William Leighton (Poet), 19th Century writer of Sons of Godwin (1876), Change (1878), Shakespeare's Dream and Other Poems (1881), etc., and manager of a glass factory.

See also

William Layton (disambiguation)